

Katarapko is a locality in the Australian state of South Australia located in the Riverland about  north-east of the state capital of Adelaide and about  north of Loxton.

Its boundaries were created in 1999 along with the selection of its name which was derived from Katarapko Island. Its extent includes all of Katarapko Island and some land located to the immediate west of the island.  It is bounded on all sides by the following watercourses with exception to part of its western and northern sides - the Katarapko Creek and the Murray River. The southern boundary was revised in 2014 to "ensure the whole of Kapunda Island is within the rural locality of Loxton."

The land within the locality is zoned for conservation with the locality being completely occupied by most of the Katarapko section of the Murray River National Park.

The 2016 Australian census which was conducted in August 2016 reports that Katarapko had a population of zero.

Katarapko is located within the federal division of Barker, the state electoral district of Chaffey and the local government area of the Berri Barmera Council.

References

Towns in South Australia
Riverland